Socorro School District may refer to:
 Socorro Consolidated Schools (New Mexico)
 Socorro Independent School District (Texas)